Ethmia livida is a moth in the family Depressariidae. It is found in Ghana and South Africa.

References

Moths described in 1852
livida
Insects of West Africa
Moths of Africa